Ashley Diane Crow (born August 25, 1960) is an American actress.  She is best known for her role of Sandra Bennet on the television show Heroes.

Life and career
Crow was born in Birmingham, Alabama. She moved to Mountain Brook, Alabama at the age of nine. She attended the University of Alabama and then graduated from Auburn University in 1982, where she was a member of the Alpha Omicron Pi sorority.

Crow first appeared in a minor role on the U.S. soap opera Guiding Light in the 1980s, followed by a longer role as Beatrice McKechnie on As the World Turns. She later co-starred with Parker Stevenson in the short-lived science fiction TV series Probe. Since then, she has appeared in guest roles on various television shows, including Dark Angel, Everybody Loves Raymond, Touched by an Angel, Party of Five, Nip/Tuck, and The Mentalist.  She had a major recurring role on Heroes as Sandra Bennet, wife of Primatech operative Noah Bennet (Jack Coleman).

Her roles in film include appearances in Minority Report, Little Big League, and The Good Son, among others.

Crow's first husband was actor Bill Shanks, who was a castmate on As the World Turns. They divorced in 1993. Crow is now married to fellow Heroes cast member Matthew John Armstrong, who played the role of Ted Sprague. She has one son, Pete Crow-Armstrong, who was selected 19th overall in the 2020 Major League Baseball Draft by the New York Mets.

Filmography

Film

Television

References

External links
 
 

1960 births
20th-century American actresses
21st-century American actresses
Actresses from Birmingham, Alabama
American film actresses
American television actresses
Auburn University alumni
Living people
Tisch School of the Arts alumni
University of Alabama alumni